Parboiled rice (also called converted rice and easy-cook rice) is rice that has been partially boiled in the husk. The three basic steps of parboiling are soaking, steaming and drying. These steps make the rice easier to process by hand, while also boosting its nutritional profile, changing its texture, and making it more resistant to weevils. The treatment is practiced in many parts of the world.

Parboiling drives nutrients, especially thiamin, from the bran to the endosperm, hence parboiled white rice is mostly nutritionally similar to brown rice.

Process and chemistry 
The starches in parboiled rice become gelatinized, then retrograded after cooling. Through gelatinization, amylose molecules leach out of the starch granule network and diffuse into the surrounding aqueous medium outside the granules which, when fully hydrated are at maximum viscosity. The parboiled rice kernels should be translucent when wholly gelatinized. Cooling brings retrogradation whereby amylose molecules re-associate with each other and form a tightly packed structure. This increases the formation of type-3, resistant starch which can act as a prebiotic and benefit health in humans. However, this also makes the kernels harder and glassier. Parboiled rice takes less time to cook and is firmer and less sticky. In North America parboiled rice is often partially or fully precooked before sale. Minerals such as zinc or iron are added, increasing their potential bio-availability in the diet.

Older methods 
In older methods, clean paddy rice was soaked in cold water for 36–38 hours to give it a moisture content of 30–35%, after which the rice was put in parboiling equipment with fresh cold water and boiled until it began to split. The rice was then dried on woven mats, cooled and milled.

Huzenlaub Process 
In the 1910s German-British scientist Erich Gustav Huzenlaub (1888–1964) and the British scientist and chemist Francis Heron Rogers invented a form of parboiling which held more of the nutrients in rice, now known as the Huzenlaub Process. The whole grain is vacuum-dried, then steamed, followed by another vacuum drying and husking. This also makes the rice more resistant to weevils and lessens cooking time.

Modern methods 

In even later methods the rice is soaked in hot water, then steamed for boiling which only takes three hours rather than the twenty hours of traditional methods. These methods also yield a yellowish color in the rice, which undergoes less breakage when milled.

Other variations on parboiling include high-pressure steaming and various ways of drying (dry-heat, vacuum, etc.)

Nutrition 

Compared to brown rice, parboiling of rice incurs losses of thiamin, niacin, biotin, and pantothenic acid by approximately 70%, 28%, 49% and 25%, respectively. Compared to normal milling, which causes a near 65% loss of all these micronutrients, parboiling preserves more of them. The specific loss depends on the process used by individual manufacturers: for the USDA #20042 sample, much less loss in these nutrients is observed. Fortification is common for parboiled rice in the United States.  Depending upon the method used, levels of arsenic can increase or decrease significantly.

In 2020, scientists assessed multiple preparation procedures of rice for their capacity to reduce arsenic content and preserve nutrients, recommending a procedure involving parboiling and water absorption.

See also 

 Matta rice
 Rice congee
 Ben's Original (formerly known as Uncle Ben's) Converted Rice

References 

Rice dishes